Sweethearts on Parade is a 1930 American pre-Code musical comedy film directed by Marshall Neilan and starring Alice White, Lloyd Hughes, and Marie Prevost. It was inspired by the Guy Lombardo recording "Sweethearts on Parade," a tune also adopted by Louis Armstrong in 1930.

Synopsis
Helen and Nita work dressing windows in a department store, where Helen attracts the attention of both a marine and a millionaire.

Cast

References

Bibliography
 Darby, William. Masters of Lens and Light: A Checklist of Major Cinematographers and Their Feature Films. Scarecrow Press, 1991.

External links

1930 films
1930 musical comedy films
1930s English-language films
American musical comedy films
Films directed by Marshall Neilan
Columbia Pictures films
American black-and-white films
1930s American films